The Territory is an 2022 internationally co-produced documentary film directed by Alex Pritz. It follows a young Indigenous leader of the Uru-eu-wau-wau people fighting back against farmers, colonizers and settlers who encroach on a protected area of the Amazon Rainforest. Filmed on location in Brazil from 2018 to 2020, the film utilizes almost exclusively on-the-ground, primary source material, including footage produced directly by the Uru-eu-wau-wau. Darren Aronofsky serves as a producer under his Protozoa Pictures banner.

The film had its world premiere at the 2022 Sundance Film Festival on January 22, 2022. It was released in select cities in the United States and Canada on August 19, 2022, by National Geographic Documentary Films and Picturehouse with wider release to follow. Its festival run has included a number of award nominations and victories, including wins at Sundance and Telluride. Critics have praised its cinematography as well the authentic portrayal of tension between Indigenous peoples and settlers in contemporary Brazil.

Synopsis

The film focuses on the Uru-eu-wau-wau, an Amazonian tribe only contacted by the Brazilian government in 1980. Originally numbering in the thousands, the tribe is presented as just 200 strong at the film's outset. Bitaté Uru-eu-wau-wau is introduced as an 18-year-old who, despite his youth, is selected as leader of Uru-eu-wau-wau in order to coordinate their protection in the face of encroaching settlers who deploy slash-and-burn tactics to establish frontier settlements. Neidinha Bandeira, an environmental and human rights activist, is the other central cast member, working tirelessly to protect Uru-eu-wau-wau land and present their story to journalists and politicians. White seizure of Indigenous land is presented as a quasi-legal movement, tacitly encouraged after the election of populist Jair Bolsonaro.

The film interweaves vérité footage of settlers themselves who, though chauvinistic, also have genuine faith in their entitlement to Amazonian land. The threat of violence hangs over the film's action. Bandeira faces near-constant death threats and the tribe deals frankly with the threat of elimination. The murder of Ari Uru-eu-wau-wau, a 33-year-old tribal leader beloved by the Uru-eu-wau-wau, is presented around the film's mid-point; the primary coordinator of tribal patrols, Ari is found murdered on a roadside with his death unsolved at the film's conclusion. The Uru-eu-wau-wau are also hit hard by COVID-19, losing 5% of their already tiny numbers.

The film's last act presents Bitaté taking up Ari's patrol leadership, teaching drone and film technology to tribe members in order to document settler intrusion and monitor territory boundaries. The tribe implements a de facto police apparatus, arresting individual settlers and destroying their out-buildings and implements. Bandeira continues her steadfast advocacy and organizing despite being deeply shaken by Ari's murder. The tribe's position is presented as resolute but extremely precarious at the film's end, with a concluding crawl noting that the Amazon clearance, the invasion of indigenous land and the appropriation of resources continues to accelerate under the Bolsonaro administration.

Release and reception
The film had its world premiere at the 2022 Sundance Film Festival on January 22, 2022. Shortly after, National Geographic Documentary Films acquired distribution rights to the film. It was released in the United States on August 19, 2022. The Territory received positive reviews from film critics. On Rotten Tomatoes, it has a 97% approval rating based on 63 reviews, with an average rating of 8/10. The website's critics consensus reads: "Visually striking, formally refreshing, and ultimately enraging, The Territory is a powerful advocacy documentary with the heart of a thriller." On Metacritic, the film holds a score of 83 out of 100 based on 17 critics, indicating "universal acclaim".

Critics acknowledge that The Territory is an advocacy film rather than a strictly disinterested documentary. The New York Times notes in its review that Indigenous people and settlers "are given near-equal amounts of screen time" but that "Pritz does not draw a false equivalency between the two; in fact, the longer time is spent with the farmers, the more alarming their gap of understanding toward the Uru Eu Wau Wau becomes." The sense of intimacy created by immediate, personal portraits of conflicting perspectives is praised across reviews, heightened by striking visuals and sound design. The LA Times calls the film a "a gripping portrait of an endangered community." A more critical review at RogerEbert.com acknowledges the cinematography but suggests that the hero-villain narrative risks simplicity and becomes monotous.

Accolades

References

External links
 

2022 films
2022 documentary films
American documentary films
British documentary films
Danish documentary films
Brazilian documentary films
Films produced by Darren Aronofsky
Protozoa Pictures films
2020s American films
2020s British films